The Alan King Tennis Classic  was a men's tennis tournament held in Las Vegas, Nevada from 1972-1985. It was an event of the WCT Tour in 1972 before joining the Grand Prix tennis circuit from 1978 until 1985, and was one of the major ranking tournaments of both tours. It was part of the Grand Prix Super Series between 1972 and 1981. The event was hosted by American comedian Alan King and was played on outdoor hard courts of the Caesars Palace hotel.

Past finals

Singles

Doubles

See also
 Tennis Channel Open
 Las Vegas Challenger

References

External links
 ATP World Tour archive

 
ATP Tour
Grand Prix tennis circuit
Defunct tennis tournaments in the United States
Hard court tennis tournaments
Tennis in Las Vegas
1972 establishments in Nevada
1985 disestablishments in Nevada